Petra Thümer (later Deckert then Katzur, born 29 January 1961) is a former swimmer from East Germany. She won gold medals in the 400 m and 800 m freestyle at the 1976 Summer Olympics and the 1977 European Aquatics Championships. During her career she set five world records in the 400 m and 800 m freestyle. In 1987 she was inducted into the International Swimming Hall of Fame.

Later she admitted to using performance-enhancing drugs as part of the East German training system. For this reason she missed the 1978 World Championships – coaches feared she would not pass the doping test and excluded her from the East German team, officially explaining her absence by injuries.

In 1979 she retired from swimming and worked as a photographer.

She was married to the German Olympic athletes Klaus Katzur (swimmer) and Alf-Gerd Deckert (cross-country skier).

See also
 List of members of the International Swimming Hall of Fame

References

1961 births
Sportspeople from Chemnitz
Doping cases in swimming
German sportspeople in doping cases
German female swimmers
East German female freestyle swimmers
Olympic swimmers of East Germany
Olympic gold medalists for East Germany
Swimmers at the 1976 Summer Olympics
Living people
World record setters in swimming
Medalists at the 1976 Summer Olympics
European Aquatics Championships medalists in swimming
Recipients of the Patriotic Order of Merit in silver
Olympic gold medalists in swimming